Coenonympha saadi, the Saadi heath is a butterfly belonging to the family Nymphalidae. The species is distributed in Transcaucasia, Iran, Iraq, and south-eastern Turkey.

Its flight period lasts from early May to late June, sometimes to early July in single generation.

The species inhabits arid sparse woodlands, desert and semi-desert areas. Host plants are Poa annua and other grasses.

Subspecies
Coenonympha saadi saadi
Coenonympha saadi iphias Eversmann, 1851 (Transcaucasia)

References

External links
"Coenonympha Hübner, [1819]" at Markku Savela's Lepidoptera and Some Other Life Forms

Coenonympha
Butterflies of Asia
Butterflies described in 1849